Captain Courageous is a fictional superhero character who first appeared in Banner Comics #3 (cover-dated September 1941) from Ace Comics.

Publishing history
Captain Courageous appeared in Banner Comics from issue #3 to #6 (September 1941 - March 1942); issue #6 was renamed Captain Courageous Comics. He then moved to the Ace title Four Favorites in issue #5 (May 1942) to #21 (January 1946).

In 2008, Captain Courageous appeared in flashback in Project Superpowers #0. The one-shot Project Superpowers: Chapter Two Prelude shows the Captain as part of a group called The Super-Mysterymen.

Fictional biography

Ace
Captain Courageous is an omnipresent supernatural being who comes to the aid of brave people who ask for courage; during the Second World War he aids the Allied forces. He appears as a man dressed in a red-and-blue costume with stars on it and a star-shaped mask. His powers include super-strength, flight, limited invulnerability, and the ability to exist underwater unaided. According to Jess Nevins' Encyclopedia of Golden Age Superheroes, "he assaults Nazis who have catapult planes concealed in a skyscraper and planes disguised as American planes, as well as man-eating locusts and Yellow Peril superhumans like the costumed Captain Nippo, a recurring character". Nippo, who had a hook hand and commanded an army of white apes, first appeared in Four Favorites issue #9 (Feb 1943) and was finally tried and executed by a military court in issue #24 (July 1946).

From Super-Mystery Comics #23 onward, the Captain trades his costume for civilian clothes and stops displaying any powers.

Project Superpowers
At some point after the war, the misguided Fighting Yank trapped the Captain and other heroes in the mystical Urn of Pandora; decades later, the Urn was broken and its inhabitants freed. Captain Courageous and seven other heroes — including Lash Lightning and Lightning Girl, Mr. Raven, Soldier Unknown, and the Sword — are then brought together to form a team called the Super-Mysterymen.

References

External links

Comics characters introduced in 1941
Dynamite Entertainment characters
Golden Age superheroes